Gord Rudbar (also Romanized as Gord Rūdbār and Gerd Rūdbār; also known as  Kord Rūdbār) is a village in Sajjadrud Rural District, Bandpey-ye Sharqi District, Babol County, Mazandaran Province, Iran. At the 2006 census, its population was 959, in 265 families.

References 

Populated places in Babol County